Dunaszentgyörgy is a village in Tolna County, Hungary.

References

Populated places in Tolna County
Populated places on the Danube